Al-Munshaat wal-Shakhsiyat Sport Club, also known as Himayat Al-Munshaat, is an Iraqi football club based in Baghdad that plays in the Iraq Division Three.

Managerial history
 Ahmed Jawad

See also
 2020–21 Iraq FA Cup

References

External links
 Al-Munshaat wal-Shakhsiyat SC on Goalzz.com
 Iraq – Foundation Dates Rec.Sport.Soccer Statistics Foundation (RSSSF)

2020 establishments in Iraq
Association football clubs established in 2020
Football clubs in Baghdad